Zeadmete is a genus of sea snails, marine gastropod mollusks in the family Cancellariidae, the nutmeg snails.

Species
Species within the genus Zeadmete include:
 Zeadmete apoensis Verhecken, 2011
 Zeadmete atlantica Petit, L.D. Campbell & S.C. Campbell, 2010
 Zeadmete aupouria Powell, 1940
 Zeadmete barkeri Powell, 1952
 Zeadmete bathyomon Bouchet & Petit, 2008
 Zeadmete bilix Bouchet & Petit, 2008
 Zeadmete finlayi Powell, 1940
 Zeadmete otagoensis Dell, 1956
 Zeadmete ovalis Dell, 1956
 Zeadmete pergradata (Verco, 1904)
 Zeadmete physomon Bouchet & Petit, 2008
 Zeadmete sikatunai Verhecken, 2011
 Zeadmete subantarctica Powell, 1933
 Zeadmete trailli (Hutton, 1873)
 Zeadmete verheckeni Petit & Harasewych, 2000
 Zeadmete watsoni Petit, 1970
 Species brought into synonymy
 Zeadmete kulanda Garrard, 1975: synonym of Iphinopsis kulanda (Garrard, 1975)

References

 Verhecken A. (2011) The Cancellariidae of the Panglao Marine Biodiversity Project 2004 and the Panglao 2005 and Aurora 2007 deep sea cruises in the Philippines, with description of six new species (Neogastropoda, Cancellarioidea). Vita Malacologica 9: 1-60. [Published 31 May 2011] [details]

Cancellariidae
Taxa named by Harold John Finlay